John Mulder was a member of the Wisconsin State Assembly.

Biography
Mulder was born to Dutch immigrants on March 22, 1865 in New Amsterdam, Wisconsin. He died on December 9, 1941 and is buried in Onalaska, Wisconsin.

Career
Mulder joined the Assembly in 1929. Additionally, he was Treasurer of La Crosse, Wisconsin, as well as an alderman and a member of the La Crosse Board of Education. He was a Republican.

References

Politicians from La Crosse, Wisconsin
Republican Party members of the Wisconsin State Assembly
Wisconsin city council members
School board members in Wisconsin
American people of Dutch descent
1865 births
1941 deaths